Arturo Ortega Olive is the general director for Aerolíneas Ejecutivas, which he founded in January 1970. Aerolíneas Ejecutivas is a Mexican company that provides private aviation services to the leaders of the Americas. Arturo holds a dual degree in Business Administration and Company Management from the Universidad Nacional Autónoma de México.

Aerolineas Ejecutivas 
Aerolíneas Ejecutivas is the second company on the continent. Their service volume is only overpowered by the US market. The company employs 530 people and provides 15,000 yearly flight hours. Their state of the art maintenance shop follows the highest quality standards. Pilots and staff are known to be highly skilled and courteous.

History and obstacles
Aerolíneas Ejecutivas struggled during its founding years as it introduced a revolutionary service into the region. Commercial flights were starting to become popular, but private aviation was at its very beginnings. Arturo Ortega worked towards solving this problem by introducing the service to Mexican businessmen. This is how Aerolíneas Ejecutivas became the pioneer in the Mexican executive flight business.

Future
Arturo Ortega believes strongly in innovation. In 2015, six new Learjet 75 were bought for US$11 million each. In addition, it is obvious to Ortega that there is a lucrative and promising market for executive flights in Mexico. There is a highly qualified labour force ready to attend to clients' needs. Bombardier is a strong supporter of the Mexican flight business as they constructed a new plant in Querétaro. Also, the country's economic stability has been a fundamental factor that has allowed for quick growth and development in this sector.

Help and preservation
Arturo Ortega Olive is passionate about protecting the environment. He believes everyone should make an effort to reduce their contribution to global warming. He is an active member of organizations that protect the Mariposa Monarca and its natural habitat.

Formula 1
Aerolíneas Ejecutivas has offered transportation services to Formula 1 stakeholders since the Mexican Grand Prix reintroduction in 2015. Notable celebrities that use their taxi service include Bernie Ecclestone, Nico Rosberg, Niki Lauda and Fernando Alonso. Besides transportation to and from the track, their primary destination has been the Teotihuacán pyramids.

References 
 http://www.dineroenimagen.com/2016-03-09/69889
 https://web.archive.org/web/20161021194202/http://ciudadanosporelcambio.org/index.php/2016/02/23/arturo-javier-ortega-olive-ayuda-y-cree-en-los-milagros/
 http://www.revistacosas.mx/actualidad/pagan-58-mil-pesos-para-llegar-en-helic%C3%B3ptero-la-f1
 http://www.teotihuacanenlineadiario.com/2016/02/arturo-ortega-olive-aerolineas.html
 http://www.dineroenimagen.com/2013-09-05/25522

Year of birth missing (living people)
Living people
Civil aviation in Mexico
Mexican aviators
Mexican businesspeople
Mexican company founders